Vinny Cha$e is an American rapper from the Harlem section of Manhattan, New York. He is signed to Cheers Club, his own record label, and Epic Records/Sony Music.  Vinny is a member of Cheers Club, a creative collective that specializes in music, fashion, and film. Cha$e received his start in the music industry by directing videos for popular artists such as Lil Wayne, Chris Brown, Cam'ron and Juelz Santana. In 2011, he released his debut mixtape, "The Plaza".

Cha$e is working on a clothing line called "Cheers Club" along with partners Kid Art and Cartier.

Discography

Mixtapes
 The Plaza (2011, Cheers Club Music)
 Double Cup City (2012, Cheers Club Music)
 Survival Of The Swag (2012, Cheers Club Music)
 King's Landing (2013, Cheers Club Music)
 Golden Army (2013, Cheers Club Music)
 Express 2 Harlem (2016, Cheers Club Music)

References 

Year of birth missing (living people)
Living people
African-American male rappers
American male rappers
Epic Records artists
People from Harlem
Rappers from Manhattan
21st-century American rappers
21st-century American male musicians
21st-century African-American musicians